Candice Breitz (born 1972) is a South African white artist who works primarily in video and photography.  She won a 2007 Prince Pierre de Monaco Prize. Her work is often characterized by multi-channel moving image installations, with a focus on the “attention economy” of contemporary media and culture, often represented in the parallelism of the identification with fictional characters and celebrity figures and widespread indifference to global issues. In 2017, she was selected to represent South Africa at the Venice Biennale.

Life 
Breitz was born in Johannesburg. She currently lives in Berlin, and has been a tenured professor at the Braunschweig University of Art since 2007. Breitz uses found video footage, appropriating video from popular culture. 
Breitz is represented by KOW (Berlin), Kaufmann Repetto (Milan / NYC) and the Goodman Gallery (Johannesburg / Cape Town / London). Breitz holds degrees from the University of the Witwatersrand, the University of Chicago, and Columbia University. She has been holding lectures and workshops at institutions such as Zentrum Paul Klee, Stony Brook Manhattan, Smith College Museum of Art, and the mentorship program Forecast.

Work 
Breitz's 2016 seven-channel installation, Love Story, shares the personal narratives of six individuals who have fled their countries in response to a range of oppressive conditions: Sarah Ezzat Mardini, who escaped war-torn Syria; José Maria João, a former child soldier from Angola; Mamy Maloba Langa, a survivor from the Democratic Republic of the Congo; Shabeena Francis Saveri, a transgender activist from India; Luis Ernesto Nava Molero, a political dissident from Venezuela; and Farah Abdi Mohamed, an idealistic young atheist from Somalia.

Exhibitions
 Yvon Lambert, "Him + Her", New York, 2009
 Kunsthaus Bregenz, "Candice Breitz: The Scripted Life", Bregenz, 2010
 Iziko South African National Gallery and Standard Bank Gallery, "Candice Breitz: Extra!", Johannesburg, 2012
 Australian Centre for the Moving Image, "Candice Breitz: The Character", Melbourne, 2013
 Museum of Fine Arts, Candice Breitz: Love Story, Boston, 2016
 Kunstmuseum Stuttgart, "Candice Breitz: Ponderosa", Stuttgart, 2016

References

Further reading

External links

Candice Breitz at The Contemporary Jewish Museum, San Francisco

Living people
1972 births
South African video artists
South African contemporary artists
20th-century South African women artists
21st-century South African women artists
People from Johannesburg
Jewish artists
Academic staff of the Braunschweig University of Art